Missouri Route 740, better known as Stadium Boulevard, is a short highway located completely within the city of Columbia, Missouri, United States. Its western terminus is at Interstate 70/U.S. Route 40 (I-70/US 40), and its eastern terminus is at Maguire Boulevard in southeast Columbia, just east of U.S. Route 63 (US 63).

Route description
Route 740 begins at an interchange with I-70/US 40 in Columbia, where the road continues north as Route E. From this interchange, the route heads south on Stadium Boulevard, a six-lane divided arterial. The road runs through business areas, passing to the east of the Columbia Mall. Route 740 intersects Route TT and becomes a four-lane undivided road that passes near wooded residential neighborhoods, turning to the east. The route heads onto the University of Missouri campus and intersects Route 163 (known locally as Providence Road) before passing to the north of Faurot Field. The road continues through the university campus and comes to an intersection with the southern terminus of Route 763. Route 740 heads east through wooded areas with some development as a four-lane divided highway. The route then comes to an interchange with US 63. Shortly after intersecting US 63, Route 740 dead-ends at Maguire Boulevard. However, future plans do call for the extension of Route 740 northeast past US 63, returning to I-70; once this is complete, it will intersect at exit 131 (Saint Charles Road) on I-70, about three miles east of the interstate's US 63 junction.

Major intersections

References

External links

740
Streets in Columbia, Missouri
Transportation in Boone County, Missouri